Wilfrid George Tatham (12 December 1898 – 26 July 1978) was a British hurdler. He competed in the men's 400 metres hurdles at the 1924 Summer Olympics. Tatham was fourth in the 440 yard hurdles at the 1930 British Empire Games.

Personal life
He was educated at Eton College and King's College, Cambridge and received the Military Cross as a member of the Coldstream Guards. He was made an Officer of the Order of the British Empire.

He was a schoolmaster at Eton College at the time of the 1930 Games.

Archives
A collection of archival material related to Wilfrid Tatham can be found at the Cadbury Research Library, University of Birmingham

References

External links
 

1898 births
1978 deaths
People educated at Eton College
Alumni of King's College, Cambridge
Recipients of the Military Cross
Coldstream Guards officers
Officers of the Order of the British Empire
Athletes (track and field) at the 1924 Summer Olympics
Athletes (track and field) at the 1928 Summer Olympics
British male hurdlers
British male middle-distance runners
Olympic athletes of Great Britain
Athletes (track and field) at the 1930 British Empire Games
Commonwealth Games competitors for England